Bekim Dema (born 30 March 1993) is an Albanian professional footballer who plays as a central midfielder for Albanian club Vllaznia Shkodër.

Club career

Early career
Dema joined Vllaznia Shkodër's under-17 side in 2008, where he played for two years before leaving to join German youth side FBG Schwerte in 2010, where he remained for a year. In July 2011 he went on a trial with newly promoted Pierwsza Liga side Zawisza Bydgoszcz along with fellow Albanian U19 international Enio Petro. This trial however proved to be unsuccessful and he returned to Albania to join Vllaznia's U19 team in 2011.

Dema left the club on 11 June 2015 as a free agent.

Skënderbeu Korçë
Dema left Vllaznia Shkodërat the end of the 2014–15 season and on 13 June 2015 joined Albanian Superliga champions Skënderbeu Korçë on a free transfer. Dema failed to make an impact during his spell, and after three league appearances throughout the season, he announced his departure in June 2016.

Kukësi
On 16 June 2016, Dema joined fellow Albanian Superliga side Kukësi on a one-year deal, and alter flew out to Maribor, Slovenia to link up with the rest of the squad on their summer training camp ahead of Europea League qualifying campaign.

He left the club in the start of January 2017.

International career
Dema has represented Albania at under-18, 19 and 21 levels. He has made only one appearance with the under-19 side, which came on 5 October 2011 in a 1–0 loss to Denmark for the qualifiers of the 2012 UEFA European Under-19 Championship.

Career statistics

Club

Honours
Skënderbeu Korçë
Albanian Superliga: 2015–16

Kukësi
Albanian Supercup: 2016

References

External links

1993 births
Living people
Footballers from Skopje
Albanian footballers from North Macedonia
Albanian footballers
Association football midfielders
KF Vllaznia Shkodër players
KF Skënderbeu Korçë players
FK Kukësi players
KF Laçi players
Kategoria Superiore players